Two Worlds may refer to:

Film and television
Two Worlds (1922 film), a German silent film directed by Richard Löwenbein
Two Worlds (1930 British film), a film directed by E.A. Dupont
Two Worlds (1930 German film), a German-language version of British film, also directed by Dupont
Two Worlds (2007 film), a French film directed by Daniel Cohen
Two Worlds (2019 film), a Burmese family drama film
"Two Worlds" (Tenkai Knights), the pilot episode of the anime series Tenkai Knights

Music
Two Worlds (ATB album) (2000)
Two Worlds (Lee Ritenour and Dave Grusin album) (2000)
Two Worlds, an album by The Aschere Project featuring Dave Davies (2010)
Two Worlds, an album by Tigers Jaw (2010)
"Two Worlds" (song), by Phil Collins (2000)
"Two Worlds", a song by Disturbed from Ten Thousand Fists (2005)

Other media
Two Worlds (drama), an 1882 play in verse by Apollon Maykov
Two Worlds (video game), a 2007 role-playing game